Neeme Suur (born 2 September 1969 in Haapsalu) is an Estonian politician. He has been member of XII and XIII Riigikogu. He was the governor of Lääne County from 2008 until 2011 and 2015, and again from 2015 until 2017. He also serve as the mayor of Risti.

He is a member of Estonian Social Democratic Party.

References

Living people
1969 births
Social Democratic Party (Estonia) politicians
Members of the Riigikogu, 2011–2015
Members of the Riigikogu, 2015–2019
Mayors of places in Estonia
Estonian University of Life Sciences alumni
People from Haapsalu